Pseudexentera is a genus of moths belonging to the subfamily Olethreutinae of the family Tortricidae.

Species
Pseudexentera costomaculana (Clemens, 1860)
Pseudexentera cressoniana (Clemens, 1864)
Pseudexentera faracana (Kearfott, 1907)
Pseudexentera habrosana (Heinrich, 1923)
Pseudexentera haracana (Kearfott, 1907)
Pseudexentera hodsoni Miller, 1986
Pseudexentera kalmiana McDunnough, 1959
Pseudexentera knudsoni Miller, 1986
Pseudexentera mali Freeman, 1942
Pseudexentera maracana (Kearfott, 1907)
Pseudexentera oregonana (Walsingham, 1879)
Pseudexentera oreios Miller, 1986
Pseudexentera senatrix (Heinrich, 1924)
Pseudexentera sepia Miller, 1986
Pseudexentera spoliana (Clemens, 1864)
Pseudexentera vaccinii Miller, 1986
Pseudexentera virginiana (Clemens, 1864)

See also
List of Tortricidae genera

References

External links
tortricidae.com

Eucosmini
Tortricidae genera